Podvolovljek is a settlement in the Municipality of Luče in Slovenia. The area belongs to the traditional region of Styria and is now included in the Savinja Statistical Region.

Name
The name Podvolovljek is a fused prepositional phrase that has lost case inflection, from pod 'below' + Volovljek. The name Volovljek is derived from the common noun vol 'ox'. The pass was recorded as Ochsenperg (literally, 'ox mountain') in 1278.

Church

The local church is dedicated to Saint Anthony the Hermit and belongs to the Parish of Luče. It was first mentioned in written documents dating to 1631.

References

External links
Podvolovljek on Geopedia

Populated places in the Municipality of Luče